Atheists with surnames starting A and B, sortable by the field for which they are mainly known and nationality.

References

surnames A to B